Montérégie is an administrative region in the southwest part of Quebec. It includes the cities of Boucherville, Brossard, Châteauguay, Longueuil, Saint-Hyacinthe, Saint-Jean-sur-Richelieu, Salaberry-de-Valleyfield and Vaudreuil-Dorion.

With approximately 18.5% of the province's population, it is the second most populous region of Quebec after Montreal. The majority of the population lives near the Saint Lawrence River, on the south shore of Montreal.

Montérégie is known for its vineyards, orchards, panoramas, products, and the Monteregian mountains. The region is both urban (second in terms of population in Quebec) and rural. The regional economy is based on agriculture and the production of goods and services. Tourism also makes up a significant portion of the economy.

History
Jacques Cartier named Mont Royal in October 1535. Samuel de Champlain built several forts to protect the colonists against the Iroquois from south of the Great Lakes, and against the English, who were colonizing New England to the southeast.

The toponym comes from the Latinized form of Mount Royal, mons regius. Montérégie is named for the Monteregian Hills, which are, in turn, named for Mont Royal (English: Mount Royal). The term for naming the set of hills in the St. Lawrence Plain was originally created in 1903 in English by geologist Frank Dawson Adams to designate a new petrographic province.

Mount Royal on Montreal Island, although outside the Montérégie region, is one of the Monteregian Hills. In addition to Mount Royal, two other Montérégie hills are not located in Montérégie: Mount Mégantic, in Estrie, and the hills of Oka, in the Lower Laurentians.

Montérégie was populated by the St. Lawrence Iroquoian people when the French began to colonize here in the early 16th century. Later colonists found their villages abandoned, and the area controlled as hunting grounds by the nations of the Iroquoian Confederacy based south of the Great Lakes.

Some of the later battles among the European-Canadians that decided the destiny of Canada took place in Montérégie. For instance, in the 1830s, ethnic French patriots rebelled against British government troops. The Province of Canada (also called a United Canada (French: Canada-Uni)) was formed through the Union Act in 1840 and February 1841, from the former provinces of Lower Canada and Upper Canada.

Originally, the administrative territory of the Montérégie parishes were taken from the territory of the canonical Diocese of Saint-Jean-Longueuil.

Subregions
The Montérégie has three administrative subregions, each consisting of its own regional county municipalities (RCM) or equivalent territories. The territorial administration of the region was conducted by three regional conferences of elected officers (CRE) separate and independent in their territory:

 Longueuil, 
 Montérégie-Est (eastern RCMs) and 
 Vallée-du-Haut-Saint-Laurent (western RCMs). 

Each sub-region was organized in the same way as other administrative regions of Quebec.

Regional county municipalities

There are 14 regional county municipalities in Montérégie. In 2021, Brome-Missisquoi and La Haute-Yamaska transferred to Estrie.

Montérégie-Est
As of 2021, there are seven RCMs in Montérégie Est. Its seat is McMasterville, and the president is Arthur Fauteux. Its territory occupies  and there are 656,287 inhabitants, with a population density of 92.1/km2 (238.6/sq mi).

Vallée-du-Haut-Saint-Laurent
There are five RCMs in Vallée-du-Haut-Saint-Laurent. Its seat is Salaberry-de-Valleyfield, and its president is Yves Daoust. Its territory occupies  and there are 435,436 inhabitants, with a population density of 116.8/km2 (302.6/sq mi).

Equivalent territory

Native Reserves
The population of both of these reserves are majority-Mohawk, one of the historic Five Nations of the Haudenosaunee, or Iroquois League. Kahnawake was established south of Montreal in 1719 as a mission village. Akwesasne was established upriver by Mohawk leaders and their families in the mid-18th century, accompanied by French Jesuit missionaries. Akwesasne spans the boundaries of Canada and the United States, extending across the St. Lawrence River into New York State, where it is referred to as the St. Regis Reservation.
 Akwesasne
 Kahnawake

Major communities
Beloeil
Boucherville
Brossard
Candiac
Chambly
Châteauguay
La PrairieLongueuil
Mont-Saint-Hilaire
Saint-Bruno-de-Montarville
Saint-Constant
Saint-Hyacinthe
Saint-Jean-sur-Richelieu
Saint-LambertSaint-Lazare
Sainte-Catherine
Sainte-Julie
Salaberry-de-Valleyfield
Sorel-Tracy
Varennes
Vaudreuil-Dorion

References

External links

Portail régional de la Montérégie Official website 
 Site officiel de la CRÉ de Longueuil  
 Site officiel de la CRÉ de la Montérégie-Est 
 Site officiel de la CRÉ de la Vallée-du-Haut-Saint-Laurent 
  Agence de la santé et des services sociaux de la Montérégie 

 
Administrative regions of Quebec